Bertrand Blanchet (born 19 September 1932) is a former Canadian Roman Catholic prelate.

Born in Montmagny, Quebec, Blanchet was ordained to the priesthood in 1956. He was appointed bishop of Gaspé in 1973. He later served as archbishop of Rimouski from 1992 until his retirement in 2008.

References 

1932 births
Living people
Canadian Roman Catholic bishops
Clergy from Quebec
People from Montmagny, Quebec
20th-century Roman Catholic archbishops
21st-century Roman Catholic archbishops
Université Laval alumni